Paul Scott Mowrer (July 14, 1887 – April 7, 1971) was an American newspaper correspondent, born in Bloomington, Illinois.  He studied at the University of Michigan and began his newspaper career as a reporter in Chicago, in 1905.  He was a correspondent at the front during the 1st Balkan War and again in the War in Europe from 1914 to 1918.  In 1921 he acted as special correspondent of the Disarmament Conference.  In 1929 he was awarded the first Pulitzer Prize for Correspondence while at the Chicago Daily News.  He also contributed many articles to magazines on world politics. In 1968, he was named Poet Laureate of New Hampshire.

In the spring of 1927, Mowrer met Hadley Richardson shortly after her divorce from Ernest Hemingway. On July 3, 1933, after a five-year courtship, Hadley and Paul Mowrer were married in London. Hadley was especially grateful to Paul for his warm relationship with Jack "Bumby" Hemingway, her son from her former marriage. Soon after the marriage, they moved to a suburb of Chicago, where they lived during World War II.

Works
 Hours of France, poems (1918)  
 Balkanized Europe: A Study in Political Analysis and Reconstruction (1921)  
 House of Europe, autobiography (1945)
 On Going to Live in New Hampshire, poems (1953)

References

External links
 Official website
 
 Paul Scott Mowrer Papers at Newberry Library
Award-winning journalist recalls children's paradise on East Grove - Pantagraph (Bloomington, Illinois newspaper)

Bibliography

American political writers
Writers from Chicago
Writers from Bloomington, Illinois
Pulitzer Prize for Correspondence winners
Writers from New Hampshire
1887 births
1971 deaths
Chicago Daily News people
University of Michigan alumni
20th-century American non-fiction writers
War correspondents of the Balkan Wars
20th-century American male writers
American male non-fiction writers